"Survivors of the Flux", prefixed frequently with either "Chapter Five" or "Flux", is the fifth and penultimate episode of the thirteenth series of the British science fiction television programme Doctor Who, and of the six-episode serial known collectively as Doctor Who: Flux. It was first broadcast on BBC One on 28 November 2021. It was written by showrunner and executive producer Chris Chibnall, and directed by Azhur Saleem.

The episode stars Jodie Whittaker as the Thirteenth Doctor, alongside Mandip Gill and John Bishop as her companions, Yasmin Khan     and Dan Lewis, respectively.

Plot 
The Weeping Angels transport the Doctor to a spacecraft carrying Division's head, Awsok from "Once, Upon Time", who is ordering an Ood to create a final Flux event. Awsok explains Division's involvement in the development of this current, and upcoming, universes. Division's spacecraft is travelling to another universe, as a "seed vault" containing genetic remnants of this universe. Awsok blames the Doctor for destroying this universe because the Doctor defected and interfered with Division's work. Thus, Division engineered the Flux to destroy this universe, with the Doctor still in it. Awsok reveals herself to be Tecteun, the Gallifreyan who found the young Doctor by a wormhole and raised her, while creating Time Lords ("The Timeless Children"). The Doctor blames Tecteun for robbing her of a life that could have been, but Tecteun counters that the Doctor does the same when she takes companions. Tecteun reveals the possession of a fob watch with the Doctor's lost memories.

Dan, Yaz, and Jericho travel around the world in 1904 to try to discover the date for world's end, evading countless assassins. A Nepalese hermit suggests they should reunite with Karvanista; although they leave a message for him at the Great Wall of China, he cannot use time travel so cannot respond. The trio search out Joseph Williamson and the mysterious tunnels he dug under Liverpool, realizing he had discovered doorways leading to various time periods and locations.

In 1958, a general asks the Grand Serpent, going by "Prentis", to help form UNIT. Prentis embeds himself into UNIT leadership over the decades, eliminating potential threats to him. In 2017, when he closes UNIT down, Kate Stewart realises his deception and threatens to expose him. After a failed assassination attempt, she goes into hiding. With UNIT eliminated, in 2021 Prentis orders Earth's defences be lowered, inviting a second Sontaran invasion.

When a Lupari ship falls from Earth's shield, Karvanista recalls the missing Lupari ship stolen by Bel, just as she was arriving at the source of the Passenger signal. With Karvanista on board, Sontaran forces attack Bel's ship. Vinder also pursues the Passenger signal, arriving moments after Bel's ship is recalled, but finding kidnapped survivors being disintegrated by Swarm and Azure for use as a power source. As he intended, Vinder is captured by Swarm in a Passenger, where he meets Diane.

Swarm and Azure arrive on the Division spacecraft and plan on exacting revenge upon Division for imprisoning them. Swarm disintegrates Tecteun and approaches the Doctor to do the same.

Production

Development 
"Survivors of the Flux" was written by showrunner and executive producer Chris Chibnall.

Casting 
The series is the third to feature Jodie Whittaker as the Thirteenth Doctor, and Mandip Gill as Yasmin Khan, with John Bishop having joined the cast for the series as Dan Lewis. Jemma Redgrave reprised her role as recurring character Kate Stewart, having been absent from the series since "The Zygon Invasion" / "The Zygon Inversion" (2015). The episode also featured an off-screen voice cameo from Nicholas Courtney, using archive audio, as Alastair Lethbridge-Stewart, the father of Redgrave's character.

Filming 
Azhur Saleem directed the second block, which comprised the third, fifth, and sixth episodes of the series.

Broadcast and reception

Broadcast 
"Survivors of the Flux" aired on 28 November 2021. The episode serves as the fifth part of a six-part story, entitled Flux.

Ratings 
Overnight the episode was seen by 3.82 million viewers. The seven-day consolidated rating (counting all views across all platforms within seven days of broadcast) was 4.83 million. The episode was the ninth-highest rated programme on BBC1 for the week, and the 21st-highest programme across all channels for the week.

Critical reception 
On Rotten Tomatoes, a review aggregator website, 80% of five critics gave the episode a positive review, with an average rating of 6.3 out of 10.

References

External links 

 
 
 

2021 British television episodes
Television episodes written by Chris Chibnall
Thirteenth Doctor episodes
Doctor Who stories set on Earth
Doctor Who pseudohistorical serials